Earle D. "Lee" Litzenberger is an American diplomat who has served as the United States Ambassador to Azerbaijan since March 2019. He previously served as Senior Advisor and Senior Bureau Official in the Department of State’s Bureau of Political-Military Affairs.

Career
Litzenberger started his career as a Management Analyst at Defense Logistics Agency and as a Field Interviewer and Tester for the University of Chicago based in Stuttgart, Germany. From 1984 to 1986 he served as Political Officer in the U.S. Embassy in Algeria. He went on to serve as Consular Officer in the U.S. Consulate General in Marseille, France. He has also served in various positions within the Department of State such as Deputy Chief of Mission at the U.S. Mission to NATO, U.S. Embassy in Serbia, and the U.S. Embassy in Kyrgyzstan.

Ambassador to Azerbaijan 
On September 4, 2018, President Trump nominated Litzenberger as United States Ambassador to Azerbaijan. On October, 4, 2018, the Senate Foreign Relations Committee held a hearing on his nomination. On January 2, 2019, the United States Senate confirmed his nomination by voice vote. On March 12, 2019, Litzenberger presented his credentials to the Azerbaijan government.

In 2020 he returned to Washington D.C. to support human rights lawyer Shahla Humbatova as she received her award as an International Women of Courage Award. She was the first person from Azerbaijan to win the award.

Personal life
Litzenberger is married and has two children. He speaks French, Russian, Serbian and Bulgarian.

See also

List of ambassadors of the United States
List of ambassadors appointed by Donald Trump

References

External links

 

Place of birth missing (living people)
Living people
Ambassadors of the United States to Azerbaijan
United States Army War College alumni
United States Foreign Service personnel
Year of birth missing (living people)
Middlebury College alumni
21st-century American diplomats